Janicke Askevold (born 29 April 1980) is a Norwegian film director, actress, and model. Askevold has acted in several notable films, including China Salesman and My Way. She also directed the 2021 film Together Alone.

Biography 
Askevold was born in Bærum, Norway. At the age of 19, she was recruited by a modelling agency, and promptly left for Milan. Askevold had her first major acting role in 2012, when she acted as Sophia in My Way. In 2017, Askevold starred in the Chinese action film China Salesman, portraying the character Susanna.

In 2021, Janicke Askevold released her first feature-length film, Together Alone. The Norwegian Kinomagasinet rated the movie at five out of six stars, calling it a "really good Norwegian film experience, with competent actors". Stavanger Aftenblad branded it a "boring bickering film".

References

External links 
 

1980 births
21st-century Norwegian actresses
Living people
Norwegian female models
Norwegian film directors
Norwegian women film directors
People from Bærum